John Olday (10 April 1905 – 1977), birth name Arthur William Oldag, was an artist, cartoonist and writer, and an anarchist revolutionary. He was active in Germany, France and Britain in the 1930s and 1940s and resided in Australia during the 1950s and 1960s. Returning to London in about 1970, he remained active in anarchist groups until his death in 1977.

Early life
Born out of wedlock in London, 1905, Olday is recorded as having no memory of his Scottish father. His German-born mother moved to New York City, where he was brought up until age 8 (1913) when his mother returned to Germany and left him with his grandmother in Hamburg. The mother apparently returned to New York and American citizenship.
In urban Hamburg, the child's life was immediately blighted by the onset of World War I and a hunger crisis precipitated by agricultural manpower losses and the Allied blockade of Germany In 1916, at the age of 11, he was a participant in workers' unrest against severe food shortages and black-market practices of the day.

Later Olday became active in the tumultuous unrest of the Kiel mutiny and the resultant German Revolution of 1918–19, reportedly "acting as an ammunition hauler for a Sparticist machine-gun emplacement. When the year-long struggle was crushingly defeated, he made a last-minute escape, narrowly avoiding certain execution"—but continued in violent activist causes until 1925, at age 20.

While still a teenager, he joined the Young Communist League of Germany (Kommunistischer Jugend Deutschlands, KJD) but was expelled for “anarchist deviations”.

Artistic career

Hamburg, 1925–1938
The few available sources (including some deemed autobiographical) indicate that Olday, having reached the age of 20, had chosen to exercise his talents as a draughtsman, cartoonist and writer, by which he could continue to advance revolutionary causes without offering himself as direct cannon-fodder. Withdrawing from participation in activist groups, 
The same source asserts that Olday's artistic and cabaret skills (and homosexual mannerisms) bestowed on him a position of privilege among "the highest circles" of the Hamburg Nazi Party, providing him with access to information which he was able to use to warn revolutionary friends and save them from committal to concentration camps. When the Nazis came to power in 1933, he renewed active links with former Anarcho-Sparticist colleagues and joined an active anti-authoritarian campaign against Hitler's dictatorship. He wrote regularly for a Hamburg newspaper. He also worked closely with Industrial Workers of the World (IWW) union seafarers coming into the port of Hamburg. Inevitably, his behaviour attracted the attention of the Gestapo who were about to arrest him as he fled to England in 1937. He had been granted a British passport that year in Hamburg on production of his birth certificate.

London, 1937–1950
Olday took with him to England the draft of an autobiographical book, Kingdom of Rags, written in German, which was translated into English and published by Jarrolds, London, in 1939. This is an account of his life in Germany, illustrated with anti-Nazi cartoons.

In 1938 he entered into a marriage of convenience in 1938 with Hilde Meisel (alias Hilda Monte), a member of the Internationaler Sozialistischer Kampfbund (International Socialist Struggle League), who thus acquired British nationality.

The transient relationship with Meisel reflected the active involvements of both in regular and dangerous assignments on the Continent in the months leading to the outbreak of war. 
 
 and produced, along with the English anti-militarist broadsheet, Forces Newsletter, in a small studio shared with Philip Sansom.

Arrested for stealing a typewriter for Freedom Press,

Australia (1950-1970)
Olday emigrated from the UK to Sydney in early 1950 and moved to Adelaide where he worked as an art gallery attendant and donated a collection of his paintings to the Art Gallery of South Australia.

He later spent time in Melbourne where he "continued his artistic-cultural-political activities" while employed as a hospital worker before returning to Sydney where he conducted "adult education classes, mime shows, recordings, radio broadcasts and exhibitions and advocacy of gay liberation".

Sydney (1963-1969)
In 1963 he is recorded as presenting masterly folksong recitals on a spacious 
houseboat moored off the northern-beach suburb of Clontarf.

In 1967, Olday opened a communal arts centre in the inner suburb of Paddington where he impressed visitors with his versatile talents ("He sings, he writes, he composes, he paints, he acts") and his sincerity, "the result of profound experience of sadness and life".

London (1970-1977)
He returned to Europe in the late 1960s, settling in London in 1970 and remaining politically active until his death of stomach cancer in 1977.

Bibliography
 "Kingdom of Rags", Jarrolds, London, 1939 
 "The March to Death" Freedom Press, London. May 1943, Reprinted May 1995. ePub at Open Library

References

External links
Christie, Stuart. (February 2020). "Edward Heath Made Me Angry. The Christie File: part 3, 1967-1975", with biography of John Olday at pages 272-275
Sanders, Huub. Anarchists in court, England, April 1945. Libcom.org. First published by Freedom Press on the occasion of World Press Freedom Day, 3 May 2010.
James, Bob (February 1998). "John Olday's Memoirs: The Australian Period"
 
 
 

1905 births
1977 deaths

British anarchists
British expatriates in Australia
British expatriates in Germany
British cartoonists
20th-century male artists